This is a list of Greek princes from the accession of George I of the House of Glücksburg to the throne of the Kingdom of Greece in 1863. Individuals holding the title of prince will usually also be styled "His Royal Highness"  (HRH). The wife of a Greek prince will usually take the title and style of her husband. Despite Greece becoming a republic in 1924 and 1973, male-line descendants of George I continue to style themselves as a Prince or Princess of Greece, as well as Prince or Princess of Denmark.

List of Greek princes since 1863

References

 
Princes
Princes
Greece